"Keeper of the Flame" is a song by British musician Martin Page, released in 1995 as the second single from his debut solo album, In the House of Stone and Light. The song peaked at No. 83 on the Billboard Hot 100, and No. 19 on the Billboard Adult Contemporary chart.

Music video
The music video features Page, a woman, a drummer, and a boy all in separate rooms in a lantern that turns into a four-room house.

Charts

References

1994 songs
1995 singles
Martin Page songs
Songs written by Martin Page
Mercury Records singles